The Japanese Federation of Forest and Wood Workers' Union (JFFWU; , Sinrin Roren) is a trade union representing forestry and wood workers in Japan.

The union was established on 3 October 1989, when the National Forest Workers' Union of Japan merged with a rival union.  It became affiliated with the Japanese Trade Union Confederation, and by 1996 it had 21,278 members.  In 2006, it was joined by the National Forestry Workers' Union of Japan.  However, it has steadily lost members, and by 2020 its membership was down to 5,362.

References

Timber industry trade unions
Trade unions established in 1989
Trade unions in Japan